The 65th parallel north is a circle of latitude that is 65 degrees north of the Earth's equatorial plane. It crosses the Atlantic Ocean, Europe, Asia and North America.

At this latitude the sun is visible for 22 hours, 4 minutes during the june solstice and 3 hours, 35 minutes during the december solstice.

Around the world 
Starting at the Prime Meridian and heading eastwards, the parallel 65° north passes through:

{| class="wikitable plainrowheaders"
! scope="col" width="125" | Co-ordinates
! scope="col" | Country, territory or ocean
! scope="col" | Notes
|-
| style="background:#b0e0e6;" | 
! scope="row" style="background:#b0e0e6;" | Atlantic Ocean
| style="background:#b0e0e6;" | Norwegian Sea
|-
| 
! scope="row" | 
| Islands and skerries of Vikna, Trøndelag
|-
| style="background:#b0e0e6;" | 
! scope="row" style="background:#b0e0e6;" | Atlantic Ocean
| style="background:#b0e0e6;" | Risværfjorden, Norwegian Sea
|-
| 
! scope="row" | 
| Mainland Trøndelag
|-
| style="background:#b0e0e6;" | 
! scope="row" style="background:#b0e0e6;" | Atlantic Ocean
| style="background:#b0e0e6;" | Årsetfjorden, Lekafjorden, Norwegian Sea
|-
| 
! scope="row" | 
| Trøndelag, Nordland
|-
| 
! scope="row" | 
| Jörn, Västerbotten County
|-
| style="background:#b0e0e6;" | 
! scope="row" style="background:#b0e0e6;" | Atlantic Ocean
| style="background:#b0e0e6;" | Gulf of Bothnia, Baltic Sea
|-
| 
! scope="row" | 
| Island of Hailuoto and mainland, passing south of Oulu.
|-
| 
! scope="row" | 
|
|-
| style="background:#b0e0e6;" | 
! scope="row" style="background:#b0e0e6;" | Arctic Ocean
| style="background:#b0e0e6;" | Onega Bay, White Sea, Barents Sea
|-
| 
! scope="row" | 
| Solovetsky Islands
|-
| style="background:#b0e0e6;" | 
! scope="row" style="background:#b0e0e6;" | Arctic Ocean
| style="background:#b0e0e6;" | Onega Bay, White Sea, Barents Sea
|-
| 
! scope="row" | 
| Onega Peninsula
|-
| style="background:#b0e0e6;" | 
! scope="row" style="background:#b0e0e6;" | Arctic Ocean
| style="background:#b0e0e6;" | Dvina Bay, White Sea, Barents Sea
|-
| 
! scope="row" | 
|
|-
| style="background:#b0e0e6;" | 
! scope="row" style="background:#b0e0e6;" | Pacific Ocean
| style="background:#b0e0e6;" | Gulf of Anadyr, Bering Sea
|-
| 
! scope="row" | 
| Chukchi Peninsula
|-
| style="background:#b0e0e6;" | 
! scope="row" style="background:#b0e0e6;" | Pacific Ocean
| style="background:#b0e0e6;" | Bering Strait, Bering SeaPassing just north of King Island, Alaska, 
|-
| 
! scope="row" | 
| Alaska
|-valign="top"
| 
! scope="row" | 
| Yukon Northwest Territories – passing through Great Bear Lake Nunavut
|-
| style="background:#b0e0e6;" | 
! scope="row" style="background:#b0e0e6;" | Arctic Ocean
| style="background:#b0e0e6;" | Roes Welcome Sound, Hudson Bay
|-
| 
! scope="row" | 
| Nunavut – Southampton Island
|-
| style="background:#b0e0e6;" | 
! scope="row" style="background:#b0e0e6;" | Arctic Ocean
| style="background:#b0e0e6;" | Foxe Basin
|-
| 
! scope="row" | 
| Nunavut – Baffin Island
|-
| style="background:#b0e0e6;" | 
! scope="row" style="background:#b0e0e6;" | Arctic Ocean
| style="background:#b0e0e6;" | Cumberland Sound, Labrador Sea
|-
| 
! scope="row" | 
| Nunavut – Cumberland Peninsula, Baffin Island
|-
| style="background:#b0e0e6;" | 
! scope="row" style="background:#b0e0e6;" | Arctic Ocean
| style="background:#b0e0e6;" | Davis Strait
|-
| 
! scope="row" | 
| Fiskevandet
|-
| style="background:#b0e0e6;" | 
! scope="row" style="background:#b0e0e6;" | Atlantic Ocean
| style="background:#b0e0e6;" | Pikiulleq, Denmark Strait
|-
| 
! scope="row" | 
| Takiseeq
|-
| style="background:#b0e0e6;" | 
! scope="row" style="background:#b0e0e6;" | Atlantic Ocean
| style="background:#b0e0e6;" | Denmark Strait
|-
| 
! scope="row" | 
|
|-
| style="background:#b0e0e6;" | 
! scope="row" style="background:#b0e0e6;" | Atlantic Ocean
| style="background:#b0e0e6;" | Norwegian Sea
|}

See also 
64th parallel north
66th parallel north

n65